Kings West was a provincial electoral district for the Legislative Assembly of New Brunswick, Canada. The riding consisted of the towns of Hampton, Rothesay and Quispamsis, and their surroundings.

The district was created in 1973, when the multi-member district Kings was subdivided into Kings Centre, Kings East and Kings West. In 1994, it was split again to create the districts of Hampton-Belleisle, Kennebecasis and Saint John-Kings.

Members of the Legislative Assembly

Election results

References

External links 
Website of the Legislative Assembly of New Brunswick
Elections New Brunswick

New Brunswick provincial electoral districts